Ama is a village in Kadrina Parish, Lääne-Viru County, in northeastern Estonia. It lies on the right bank of the Loobu River.

References

External links
 Weather in Ama

Villages in Lääne-Viru County